Clathrus roseovolvatus is a species of fungus in the stinkhorn family. Described as new to science in 2013, it is found in the South America and the Caribbean.

References

External links

Fungi described in 2013
Phallales
Fungi of the Caribbean
Fungi of South America